Coscinoptycha improbana, the Australian guava moth, is a moth of the family Carposinidae and only member of the genus Coscinoptycha. It is native to Australia, where it is found from Eungella in Queensland down through New South Wales, Victoria and Tasmania. It also occurs on Norfolk Island and has been recorded from New Zealand since 1997. The presence of this species has also been detected in New Caledonia in 2012.

Adults are on wing year-round.

The larvae have been recorded feeding on Psidium species (including Psidium guajava), Feijoa sellowiana, Macadamia integrifolia, Eriobotyra japonica, Prunus domestica, Prunus persicae, Pyrus pyrifolia, Citrus species (including Citrus unshiu and Citrus limon), Cassine australis and Schizomeria ovata. They bore into the fruits of their host plants. First to third or fourth instar larvae are found inside ripening fruit while the fruit is still on the tree. In fruit such as loquat, macadamia and peach, larvae are found feeding inside the kernel. Larvae leave the fruit through an exit hole to pupate when the fruit has fallen to the ground.

References

Carposinidae
Moths of New Zealand
Moths of Australia
Moths described in 1881